In Reformed Christian ethics, the creation mandates or creation ordinances are the commandments given to Adam and Eve in Genesis 1 and 2. These predate the Mosaic Law and are often thought to apply to all people rather than just Christians. They include the cultural mandate, including marriage and procreation (Gen 1:28), the labour mandate (Gen 2:15), and the Sabbath (Gen 2:3).

References

Religious concepts related with Adam and Eve
Christian ethics
Calvinism